The Scottish National Bowls Championships is one of the oldest bowls competitions in the world. In 1892 Mr James Brown of Sanquhar BC and Dr Clark of the Partick BC formed the Scottish Bowls Association and organised the first rink (fours) championship the following year at the Queen's Park Club, Glasgow (it was the first National Championships and was known as the McEwan Cup).

The first singles winner (originally called the Roseberry Trophy) was George Sprot and his son Bob Sprot was a three time champion and the first gold medal singles champion at the Commonwealth Games for Scotland.

Men's Singles Champions

Most singles titles

Men's Pairs Champions

Men's Triples Champions

Men's Fours Champions

Women's Singles Champions

Most singles titles

Women's Pairs Champions

Women's Triples Champions

Women's Fours Champions

References

Bowls competitions
Bowls in Scotland